Arroyo Hondo is a settlement in Cuba near Guantánamo Bay. It is located in the municipality of Guantánamo.

See also
Las Lajas
Paraguay (village)
List of cities in Cuba

References

Populated places in Guantánamo Province
Guantánamo